Palos Verdes High School (PVHS) is one of three public high schools on the Palos Verdes Peninsula in Los Angeles County, Southern California, USA (the others being Palos Verdes Peninsula High School (formerly Rolling Hills High School) and Rancho Del Mar High School). Located by the ocean in Palos Verdes Estates, the school is part of the Palos Verdes Peninsula Unified School District.

History
Originally opened in 1961, the school earned many awards for academic and athletic excellence before declining enrollments led the District to close PVHS in 1991, combining three existing high schools into Palos Verdes Peninsula High School (PVPHS). The campus remained in use as Palos Verdes Intermediate School, with the former intermediate schools having been closed as part of the reorganization. In 2002, climbing enrollments and overcrowding at Peninsula High School led the district to reopen Palos Verdes High School. By the first year, enrollment reached 470 students.

Athletics
The athletic teams (known as the Sea Kings) are represented by the colors red, black, and white. The nickname comes from the Greek god Poseidon, the school's official mascot. Palos Verdes competes in the Southern Section, Northern Division of the California Interscholastic Federation.

Fall Sports:
 Cheer(JV, V)
 Boys' Cross Country
 Girls' Cross Country
 Football(F, JV, V)
 Girls' Golf(JV, V)
 Song(JV, V)
 Girls' Tennis(JV, V)
 Girls' Volleyball(F/S, JV, V)
 Boys' Water Polo(F/S, JV, V)

Winter Sports:
 Boys' Basketball(F/S, JV, V)
 Girls' Basketball(F/S, V)
 Boys' Soccer(F/S, JV, V)
 Girls' Soccer(F/S, JV, V)
 Boys' Surf(V)
 Girls' Surf(V)
 Girls' Water Polo(F/S, JV, V)

Spring Sports:
 Baseball(F/S, JV, V)
 Boys' Golf(JV, V)
 Boys' Lacrosse(JV, V)
 Girls' Lacrosse(JV, V)
 Softball(JV, V)
 Boys' Swimming(F/S, V)
 Girls' Swimming(F/S, V)
 Boys' Tennis(JV, V)
 Boys' Track
 Girls' Track
 Boys' Volleyball(F/S, JV, V)

Notable alumni

Dana Rohrabacher (Former Member U.S House of Representatives), Class of 1965
Former Senator George Felix Allen (R-VA), Class of 1970
Jan van Breda Kolff, former college and professional basketball player, SEC Player of the Year (1974), Class of 1970
Christopher Boyce (convicted of espionage, subject of the movie The Falcon and the Snowman, from Robert Lindsey's book of the same name), Class of 1971
Andrew Daulton Lee (convicted of espionage, subject of the movie The Falcon and the Snowman, from Robert Lindsey's book of the same name), Class of 1970
Craig Hogan, Director of Fermilab Center for Particle Astrophysics, Class of 1972
Blair Bush (former center in the NFL), Class of 1974
Billy Martin, Tennis Pro & long time UCLA Tennis Head Coach, Class of 1974
Bill Laimbeer (Detroit Pistons star and former WNBA coach), Class of '75 and leader of the 1975 CIF championship basketball team.
Matt Wuerker, Political cartoonist, winner of the 2012 Pulitzer Prize for Editorial Cartooning, Class of 1975
Daniel Levitin (neuroscientist, musician and author), Class of 1975
Mark Acres, (pro basketball; Boston Celtics 1987-1989, Orlando Magic 1989-1992, Houston Rockets 1992, Washington Bullets 1993), Class of 1981
Carin Jennings, Member of the USWNT, Class of 1983
Pete Sampras (tennis great) (attended 1985-88)
Heather Burge WNBA player, Class of 1989
Heidi Burge - WNBA player, Class of 1989
John Welbourn, NFL offensive lineman, formerly with the Philadelphia Eagles and Kansas City Chiefs (attended 1990-1991)
Sable Starr was an American groupie, often described as the "queen of the groupie scene" in Los Angeles during the early 1970s
Joe Walker, NFL linebacker for the Philadelphia Eagles
Matt Grace, MLB pitcher for the Washington Nationals
Bryan James Scott, Quarterback for the Generals of The Spring League
Toulouse Engelhardt, Guitar Virtuoso,Recording Artist and Composer, Class of 69

Notable faculty
Jovan Vavic - former water polo coach

References

External links
 

1961 establishments in California
Educational institutions established in 1961
High schools in Los Angeles County, California
Palos Verdes Peninsula Unified School District
Public high schools in California